Miss World Malaysia is a national beauty pageant and an organisation based in Malaysia. The winner will represents the country at Miss World. On occasion, when the winner does not qualify (due to age or any other reason), a runner-up is sent.

The reigning Miss World Malaysia is Wenanita Angang of Sabah. It is Sabah's first victory in 7 years, and the fifth victory of the state in the pageant's history. She will represent her country at Miss World 2023.

History 
Eric Morley first invitation for Malaysia in Miss World was in 1959 when the country was known as Malaya back then. In 1963, a national beauty pageant was organised to select Malaysia's first representative at Miss World which was held on 20 April 1963, at the Stadium Negara in Kuala Lumpur. 19-year-old Catherine Loh, representing Brunei was being elected as Miss Malaysia 1963. Loh was crowned by the French actress Capucine in an event that was attended by 30 candidates from across the federation. Loh had been “Miss Brunei” for three consecutive years.

On 7 August 2018, the pageant moved to a new management under Fantastic Golden Sdn. Bhd. which has been the official licencee of Miss World Malaysia Organisation while Singaporean singer, songwriter and social entrepreneur Dr. Sean Wong, PBM, as appointed by Mrs. Julia Morley, chairwoman of Miss World Organisation, is the national director of the prestigious beauty contest.

On 31 January 2022, it was confirmed via Instagram that the national director of Miss World Malaysia, Dr. Sean Wong, had also acquired the local franchises of Miss Supranational Malaysia and Miss Grand Malaysia pageants.

Notable winners 
 Catherine Loh (Miss World Malaysia 1963) – She was born in Beaufort, North Borneo (now Sabah) and was raised in Brunei Town (now Bandar Seri Begawan). She competed in Miss Malaysia 1963 as Miss Brunei. She was the first Bruneian woman to ever compete in an international pageant. She finished in the Top 14 at Miss World 1963.
 Michelle Yeoh (Miss World Malaysia 1983) – She was known internationally for her roles in the 1997 James Bond film Tomorrow Never Dies and the Chinese-language martial arts film Crouching Tiger, Hidden Dragon (2000).
 Erra Fazira (Miss World Malaysia 1992) – A successful celebrity, singer and actress.
 Rahima Orchient Yayah (Miss World Malaysia 1994) – The first and only Muslim woman from Malaysia to ever qualify into the Top 10 in Miss World 1994. She is now a successful businesswoman in Malaysia.
 Lina Teoh (Miss World Malaysia 1998) – She finished as second runner-up in Miss World 1998. The highest placement for Malaysia in Miss World.
 Soo Wincci (Miss World Malaysia 2008) – The first titleholder to receive a PhD.
 Dewi Liana Seriestha (Miss World Malaysia 2014) – The first titleholder to win the Miss World Talent award in Miss World 2014.
 Larissa Ping (Miss World Malaysia 2018) – She won Head to Head Challenge for Round 1 and 2 in Miss World 2018. She was being consistent throughout her journey in the contest and made it to almost all the fast track events.

Editions

Requirements 
Requirements for participants of the Miss World Malaysia election: (2018)
 Malaysian citizen, ages 18 to 26.
 Non-Muslim and not married or divorced or have had children.
 Height must be at least 165 cm and above in order to participate.
 Must be able to communicate well in English and Bahasa Melayu.
 Preferably special expertise or achievements in various fields (music, dance, singing, leadership, etc.)

Titleholders

Representatives to Miss World

Notes

See also 
 Miss World

References 

 
Malaysia
Beauty pageants in Malaysia
Recurring events established in 1963